was a government minister during the Kofun period of ancient Japanese history.

Life 
In 512, the king of the Korean kingdom of Baekje (called Kudara by the Japanese) requested to take control of four districts of the land of the Gaya confederacy (known to the Japanese as Mimana). Arakabi was ordered by Emperor Keitai to report the emperor's consent, but at the advice of his wife feigned illness and claimed to be unable to make the journey. The legendary Japanese warrior queen Empress Jingū was said to have conquered these lands for the Yamato state some centuries earlier (around the years 200–300 CE), and Arakabi and his wife took this as a sign that the kami wished for these lands to be in Japanese hands.

As minister, Arakabi led expeditions to fight off outside peoples, and also to repress the revolts of various rebellious elements within the Yamato state, such as Iwai, the governor of Tsukushi, whose revolt was repressed in 527.

See also 

Takaoka clan

References
Papinot, Edmond (1910). "Arakabi." Historical and geographical dictionary of Japan. Tokyo: Librarie Sansaisha. Vol. 1 p. 402.

External links
Nihon Shoki Online English Translations.Scroll 17 - Emperor Keitai

People of Kofun-period Japan
536 deaths
Aristocracy of ancient Japan
Year of birth unknown
Mononobe clan